Miljan is a masculine given name of South Slavic origin.

Notable people with the name include:

Miljan Goljović (born 1971), Serbian-born retired Slovenian basketball player
Miljan Govedarica (born 1994), Bosnian footballer
Miljan Miljanić (1930–2012), Serbian football coach
Miljan Mrdaković (born 1982), Serbian footballer
Miljan Pavković (born 1981), Serbian basketball player
Miljan Radović (born 1975), retired Montenegrin footballer
Miljan Vuković (born 1990), Serbian rower
Miljan Zekić (born 1988), Serbian tennis player

See also
 Miljanić
Miljanovac
Miljanovci (Kalesija)

Slavic masculine given names
Serbian masculine given names
Montenegrin masculine given names